The Battle of Olympus is a 1988 action role-playing video game for the Nintendo Entertainment System. It was released in North America in 1990, in Europe in 1991. A port for the Game Boy was also released.

Plot 
The Battle of Olympus takes place in an ancient Greece which is being terrorized by Hades, the dark ruler of the underworld.

Helene, the girlfriend of Orpheus, is kidnapped by Hades who is holding her captive. A top-down map of Greece shows various dungeons and ancient Greek city-states for the player to visit on their journey. Swords, shields, and crystals help to provide offensive power and defensive strength for the player. Three fragments of love are there to remind Orpheus of his girlfriend Helene. Hades rules his dominion in Tartarus, where his strongest minions live alongside him.

During his adventure, Orpheus needs to meet the Greek gods and gain their favor, starting with Zeus, the leader of the Olympian gods, who encourages the other gods to grant Orpheus powers. These powers are in the form of a weapon, a shield, and other special equipment, among them a harp, which summons Pegasus to carry Orpheus to far locations. As the game progresses, players are exposed to various forms of upgraded weaponry. The player starts off with a basic wooden club. The player later obtains items such as the Staff of Fennel (also known as a thyrsus, which is able to project a fireball), Nymph's Sword, and the Divine Sword (able to project a lightning bolt).

The game features encounters with mythological creatures such as the Taurus, Lamia, cyclops, centaur, Talos, Minotaur, Graeae, Cerberus, Stymphalian birds, Nemean lion, and also a Siren. Players must fight their way deep into the underworld, fight and defeat Hades, and finally save Helene. Several items depicted in the Greek mythology are acquired, such as the Harp of Apollo, the Sword of Hephaestus, the Staff of Prometheus, and the Sandals of Hermes.

Gameplay

Primarily a sidescroller with some light platforming, the player is a hero with a sword and shield, while just a handful of secondary items come along later in the game, mostly for the purpose of advancement as the protagonist move to new areas. He can find upgrades maximum health, protection, and speed. The biggest differences in combat from Zelda II are the lack of the downward stab in midair, and the lack of the sword beam at full health. However, The Battle of Olympus does have a sword later in the game that can shoot beams, but doing so damages the health bar if a certain item is not found first.

The Battle of Olympus is somewhat non-linear and there are some optional side quests that can make the game easier in the long run, leading to a secret item or power-up from one of the gods.

The final battle brings to the Temple of Hades in fight with the ruler of the underworld in a two-stage event. The first is a blind fight against a shadow reflection, and then the final form is of Hades himself.

Development 
The Battle of Olympus was developed by Infinity, and was the first game from the company. The dev team for the game was quite small, with only three members. Yukio Horimoto served as designer and programmer for the game. Kazuo Sawa was the composer, and Reiko Oshida, Horimoto's future wife, did story and graphics.

Designer Hoshimoto drew inspiration from Zelda II: Adventure of Link for gameplay. Similarities include a final confrontation with a shadow, similar character abilities, and the general appearance of the game. It was one of several NES games inspired by Zelda II, which also include Moon Crystal.

Release
It was published by Imagineer as "Olympus no Tatakai" and released in Japan on March 28, 1988.  In North America, it was published by Broderbund and released in December 1989. In Europe, it was published by Nintendo and released in 1991.

The game was ported to the Game Boy by Canadian developer Radical Entertainment in 1993 and published by Imagineer for the European market only.

Reception

Japanese game magazine Famitsu gave it a score of 28 out of 40. Reviewers noted similarities between the game and to the earlier game, Zelda II: The Adventure of Link.

Notes

References

External links 

1988 video games
Broderbund games
Game Boy games
Imagineer games
Nintendo Entertainment System games
Orpheus
Platform games
Radical Entertainment games
Side-scrolling role-playing video games
Video games set in Greece
Video games based on Greek mythology
Video games developed in Canada
Video games developed in Japan